Quim may refer to:
Quim (footballer, born 1959), or Joaquim Carvalho de Azevedo, retired Portuguese footballer
Quim (footballer, born 1967), or Joaquim Manuel Aguiar Serafim, Portuguese football coach and former player
Quim (footballer, born 1975), or Joaquim Manuel Sampaio da Silva, Portuguese footballer
Quim (magazine), lesbian erotica magazine published in the UK between 1989 and 2001
Quim Torra (born 1962), Spanish politician
Dated British slang for vulva